Annaheim may refer to:

 Melanie Annaheim, a Swiss triathlete
 Annaheim, Saskatchewan
 Annaheim meteorite, an iron meteorite recovered in 1916

See also 
 Anaheim (disambiguation)